Andrea Stoppini (born 29 February 1980) is an Italian former professional tennis player.

Personal life
Currently resides in his city of birth, Trento.

Tennis career
Stoppini turned professional in 1998. His career-high singles ranking is World No. 161, achieved on 13 July 2009.

2006
At the 2006 Legg Mason Tennis Classic, Stoppini (then ranked World No. 246) scored the greatest victory of his career, defeating former World No. 1 Andre Agassi (amidst his retirement tour) in the second round 6–4, 6–3.

2009
In the first round of the 2009 Australian Open, Stoppini lost to defending champion Novak Djokovic, 6–2, 6–3, 7–5.

Making his second appearance at Wimbledon in 2009, he beat the No. 1 qualifying seed Sergiy Stakhovsky from Ukraine 2–6, 6–3, 6–3, in the first qualifying round, Marcus Willis from Great Britain 6–2, 6–4 in the second, before losing to Rajeev Ram 6–4, 6–2, 6–4 in the final qualifying match.

External links
 
 
 

1980 births
Living people
Italian male tennis players
Sportspeople from Trento